The 1962 American Football League season was the third regular season of the AFL.  It consisted of 8 franchises split into two divisions: the East Division (Buffalo Bills, Houston Oilers, Titans of New York, Boston Patriots) and the West Division (San Diego Chargers, Denver Broncos, Dallas Texans, Oakland Raiders).

The season ended when the Texans defeated the Houston Oilers in the AFL Championship game.

Division races
The AFL had 8 teams, grouped into two divisions.  Each team would play a home-and-away game against the other 7 teams in the league for a total of 14 games, and the best team in the Eastern Division would play against the best in the Western Division in a championship game.  If there was a tie in the standings at the top of either division, a one-game playoff would be held to determine the division winner.

The 1962 season started out as a race between Houston and Boston in the East, and Dallas and Denver in the West.  After seven games, the Broncos were 6–1–0 and the Texans right behind at 5–1–0, while Boston and Houston were tied at 4–2–0.

In Week Eight, Buffalo beat Denver 45–38, while Dallas won at Houston, 31–7.  The Oilers' loss, and Boston's 26–16 win over Oakland, put the Patriots and Texans at the top of their divisions.  The next week, though, Houston won its rematch at Dallas, 14–6, and though it did not help the Oilers, Denver made a comeback to win 23–20 at San Diego to reclaim the division lead on November 4.  In Week Ten, Boston beat Denver 33–29.  Houston stayed half a game behind Boston, while Dallas pulled half a game ahead of Denver.

In Week Eleven (November 18), Houston won at Boston, 21–17, to reclaim the East, and Dallas won 24–3 at Denver to boost its lead.  Houston and Boston continued to win, but in the final week, the Oilers clinched the division with a 44–10 win over the Titans.

Regular season

Results

Standings

Playoffs

Awards

Stadium changes
 The Oakland Raiders moved from Candlestick Park in San Francisco to Frank Youell Field in Oakland

Coaching changes

Offseason
Boston Patriots: Mike Holovak began his first full season as Boston's head coach. He took over the head coaching duties after Lou Saban was fired after five games in 1961.
Buffalo Bills: Buster Ramsey was fired and replaced by Lou Saban.
Denver Broncos: Frank Filchock was fired and replaced by Jack Faulkner.
Houston Oilers: Pop Ivy was named as the Oilers new head coach. Lou Rymkus was fired after five games in 1961, and assistant coach Wally Lemm took over the head coaching duties for the rest of that season.
New York Titans: Sammy Baugh was replaced by Bulldog Turner.

In-season
Oakland Raiders: Marty Feldman was fired after five games. Red Conkright served as interim for the rest of the season.

External links
Football Database

 
American Football League seasons